Susan Beth Pfeffer (born February 17, 1948) is a retired American author best known for young adult science fiction.  After writing for 35 years, she received wider notice for her series of post-apocalyptic novels, officially titled "The Life As We Knew It Series", but often called "The Last Survivors" or "Moon Crash" series, some of which have appeared on the New York Times Bestselling List.

Background
Pfeffer was born in New York City, the daughter of Leo Pfeffer, a lawyer and professor, and his wife, Freda nee Plotkin. She began writing stories as a child.  She published her first book, Just Morgan, in 1970, when she was a senior at New York University. After college, she moved to Middletown, New York, where she still lives, and continued to write full-time. She has published more than 75 books.

Pfeffer's books cover the range of children's literature from picture books to young-adult novels. They include biographies for younger readers, and both historical, such as the Portraits of Little Women series, and contemporary fiction. She also wrote a book for adults about how to write for children.  About David (1980) and The Year Without Michael (1987) are two of her books that have received critical notice. Pfeffer says that she enjoys writing about family dynamics. Pfeffer achieved wider notice with her 2006 book Life as We Knew It, a bestseller. This became the first of her Moon Crash series. Pfeffer cites the film Meteor as inspiration for the Moon Crash series.

Works

Just Morgan (1970)
Better Than All Right (1972)
Rainbows & Fireworks (1973)
The Beauty Queen (1974)
Whatever Words You Want to Hear (1974)
Marly the Kid (1975)
Kid Power (1977)
Starring Peter and Leigh (1979)
Awful Evelina (1979; picture book)
About David (1980)
Just Between Us (1980)
What Do You Do When Your Mouth Won't Open? (1981)
Starting with Melodie (1982)
A Matter of Principle (1982)
Courage, Dana (1983)
Truth or Dare (1984)
Kid Power Strikes Back (1984)
Fantasy Summer (1984)
Make Me a Star series (1985–1986)
Getting Even (1986)
The Friendship Pact (1986)
The Year Without Michael (1987)
Thea at Sixteen (1988)
Rewind to Yesterday (1988)
Evvie at Sixteen (1988; Sebastian Sisters series)
Turning Thirteen (1988)
Future Forward (1989)
Claire at Sixteen (1989)
Sybil at Sixteen (1989)
Head of the Class (1989)Dear Dad, Love Laurie (1989)April Upstairs (1990)Most Precious Blood (1990)Meg at Sixteen (1990)Darcy Downstairs (1990)Twin Surprises (1991; picture book)Family of Strangers (1992)Twin Troubles (1992; picture book)Make Believe (1993)The Ring of Truth (1993)The Riddle Streak (1993)Twice Taken (1994)Sara Kate, Superkid (1994)Nobody's Daughter (1995)Sara Kate Saves the World (1995)The Pizza Puzzle (1996)The Trouble With Wishes (1996)Meg's Story (1997; Portraits of Little Women series)Jo's Story (1997)Beth's Story (1997)Amy's Story (1997)Justice for Emily (1997)Meg Makes a Friend (1998)Jo Makes a Friend (1998)Beth Makes a Friend (1998)Amy Makes a Friend (1998)Devil's Den (1998)A Gift for Meg (1999)A Gift for Beth (1999)A Gift for Jo (1999)A Gift for Amy (1999)Revenge of the Aztecs (2000)Blood wounds (2011)

Moon Crash Series/The Last Survivors/Life As We Knew It SeriesLife as We Knew It (2006), Harcourt Children's Books .The Dead and the Gone (2008), Harcourt Children's Books .This World We Live In (2010), Harcourt Children's Books .The Shade of the Moon (2013), Harcourt Children's Books, .

Short stories
She also wrote some short stories such as As it is with Strangers.

Awards
Pfeffer's books have won the Dorothy Canfield Fisher Children's Book Award, the Buxtehude Bull prize and been named awarded an American Library Association Best Books for Young Adults (2007) and Teens’ Top Ten Booklist in 2007. She was a finalist for the Andre Norton Award, Quill Awards and Hal Clement Award.

References

 Sources 
Crossen, C. (2008, October 24). Weekend Journal; Adviser: Dear Booklover. Wall Street Journal  (Eastern Edition),  p. W.2.  Retrieved April 6, 2010, from ABI/INFORM Global.
Goodnow, C. (2008, December 18). "Profits of Doom: Teen Readers are eating up Post-Apocalyptic Tales",  Seattle Post - Intelligencer, p. B.1.  Retrieved April 6, 2010, from Business Dateline
John, G. (2008). "Scary New World", New York Times Book Review, p. 30. Retrieved via EBSCOhost database, 6 April 2010.
"Must-Reads Blend Fright, Fun". (2009, January 26). The Washington Post, p. B.2.  Retrieved April 6, 2010, from Business Dateline.
Springen, K.  (2010, February). Apocalypse Now. Publishers Weekly, 257(7), 21.  Retrieved April 6, 2010, from ABI/INFORM Global.
Woolingtons, Rebecca (2010, March 11). "Book Wars Come to High School. The popular reading competition opens to older students." The Register - Guard'', L.1.  Retrieved April 6, 2010, from Business Dateline.
Young Adult Library Services Association. Best Book for Young Adults 2007. American Library Association. Retrieved from web, 6 April 2010. 
Young Adult Library Services Association. (2007).  Teens’ Top Ten Booklist. American Library Association.  Retrieved from web, 6 April 2010.

External links
List of books (up to 2000)
Podcast Interview with Susan Beth Pfeffer at Scripts & Scribes

20th-century American novelists
21st-century American novelists
American science fiction writers
American women novelists
Living people
1948 births
Women science fiction and fantasy writers
Writers from New York City
Writers of young adult science fiction
20th-century American women writers
21st-century American women writers
Novelists from New York (state)